Here Without Me is an Iranian drama film written and directed by Bahram Tavakoli and produced by Saeed Sadi, produced in 2010 and screened in 2011. The film stars Fatemeh Motamed-Aria, Saber Abar, Negar Javaherian and Parsa Pirouzfar. The story is about a family of three dreaming about their wishes, and was inspired by the play The Glass Menagerie, written by Tennessee Williams. Fatemeh Motamed-Arya won the best actress award in the 35th Montreal World Film Festival (WFF) for this film.

Plot
Based on The Glass Menagerie, the movie details the story of Yalda (Negar Javaherian), a disabled girl who has a great interest for collecting glass animals. She harbors a secret attraction towards her brother Ehsan's best friend Reza (Parsa Pirouzfar). Her brother Ehsan (Saber Abar), whose voiceover introduces the film, writes poetry and desperately dreams of leaving Iran. He dreams of being a writer and spends his spare time haunting cinemas and watching old movies over and over. Farideh (Fatemeh Motamed-Aria) holds down two jobs to help support her family. Farideh is trying her best to find a prompt suitor for her introvert daughter Yalda.

Cast
 Fatemeh Motamed-Aria as Farideh
 Saber Abar as Ehsan
 Negar Javaherian as Yalda
 Parsa Pirouzfar as Reza

Release
Screened and welcomed by critics and audience in 11th Tiburon Film Festival
35th Montréal Film Festival, 2011  
2nd Iranian Film Festival Australia, 2012 
36th Cleveland International Film Festival, 2012

Reception

Awards

References

External links
 

2011 films
2011 drama films
2010s Persian-language films
Iranian drama films